is a party video game developed by NDcube and published by Nintendo for the Nintendo 3DS. It is the fourth handheld game in the Mario Party series. The game features a new party mode known as Toad Scramble which deviates from the normal Mario Party series in its removal of turn-based gameplay in favor of the ability to move at will, simultaneous with other players, and without set paths on the game board. 

The game was released in Europe, Australia, and Japan in October 2016, and in North America the following month. The game is preceded by Mario Party 10 for the Wii U.

Gameplay 

Mario Party: Star Rush is a handheld party video game in the Mario Party series based on group minigame events that follow a board game concept. Star Rushs main change to the franchise is its replacement of turn-based gameplay with the ability to move at will, simultaneously, and without set paths on the game board. The game's main mode is "Toad Scramble", in which all players play as Toad from the Mario franchise. Other Mario series characters can be recruited to play on the player's team, but are not themselves playable. Star Rush features boss battles where players compete to deal the most damage to the boss.

Up to four players can join a common multiplayer game when near other players through the Nintendo 3DS handheld console's local wireless mode. A free software available on the Nintendo eShop, titled Mario Party: Star Rush - Party Guest, is a demo allowing players to join players with a full game and includes a limited number of minigames. The game is also compatible with fifteen of Nintendo's Amiibo figurines.

Modes 
In a Toad Scramble, all 4 players start as different colored Toads with the goal of retrieving stars from Bosses. Along the way, players can recruit allies, and collect or buy items to increase their chances of winning. Minigames are played throughout, and coins are given to the player that wins the minigame, and stars are given to the player that wins each special boss minigame. The winner is the player that can earn the most stars and coins once all the bosses are defeated.

In Coinathlon, 1-4 players play unique minigames which give an independent amount of coins based on the player's performance. Items can be collected to enhance one's score or to hinder a rival's game. Each coin advances the player one space on a board, the winner is the player that can complete the designated number of laps across the board. The minigames increase in difficulty and coins given. In longer game modes, the difficulty is increased with the addition of Bowser minigames, where losing players are sent back a number of spaces along the board.

In Balloon Bash, 4 players choose a character to play as and similar to a Toad Scramble, a dice is thrown by each player to determine the number of spaces they can move on the board, items can be collected or bought and balloons can be collected to play minigames - which can be used to earn coins. Unlike a Toad Scramble, coins cannot be automatically exchanged for stars. Instead, special star balloons can be collected to exchange 10 coins per star, in a designated amount. The winner is the player who collects the most stars, regardless of the amount of coins they earn.

Development 
Nintendo announced the game at the end of a press release for the 2017 The Legend of Zelda: Breath of the Wild during its June 2016 Electronic Entertainment Expo coverage. Journalists described the announcement as "hidden". Nintendo showed more of the game the next day. Shortly after its announcement, Twitter users commented on how the game's box art was reused from other projects, including the label of SpaghettiOs canned pasta. Closer to the game's release, the box was updated with original art. The removal of the turn-based format was designed to make the game better for portable play. Mario Party: Star Rush was released in Europe on October 7, 2016, in Australia on October 8, 2016, in Japan on October 20, 2016, and in North America on November 4, 2016.

Reception 

The game received mixed reception, according to review aggregator Metacritic, with a score of 68 based on 40 reviews. Sean Buckley of Engadget praised the new design choice to remove the turn-based format. He wrote that Mario Party minigames were fun but that the board game format was antiquated. Chris Carter of Destructoid lauded the removal of the series' "car" mechanic, in which all players traveled in a car together on the game board, though he remained "not hopeful" for the new game overall. In Japan, the game sold less than 30,000 units in its first week. It has sold 88,544 in the region as of December 16, 2016.

Notes

References 

Star Rush
2016 video games
CAProduction games
Nintendo 3DS games
Nintendo 3DS-only games
Nintendo 3DS eShop games
Nintendo Network games
Party video games
Multiplayer and single-player video games
Video games developed in Japan
Video games that use Amiibo figurines
NDcube games